The Kingdom of Mewar, sometimes known as Udaipur State, was ruled by the Sisodia dynasty. It was an independent kingdom in Rajputana region of India. It was established around the 7th century as minor rulers of the Nagada-Ahar region of Udaipur and later in the 10th century, it transformed into an independent state under Rawal Bharttripatta II. In 1303, the kingdom was invaded, its capital fort Chittorgarh was besieged and taken by Alauddin Khalji killing the entire main branch of the family known as the Rawal Branch. A junior branch of the family called the Ranas later regained the control of the kingdom in 1326 and under them, the kingdom became the most powerful kingdom in North India until the Mughal Invasion of India in 1526. The kingdom under Udai Singh II and Maharana Pratap was constantly engaged in a struggle with the Mughals and continued through the kingdom accepting Mughal suzernity in 1615 and ended around 1707 when Aurangzeb died. In 1818, it accepted British suzerainty and in 1947, Bhupal Singh signed the Instrument of Accession to India and joined the Dominion of India.

Geography 

The geographical boundaries of Mewar have waxed and waned over the centuries, but as of 1941, the area of the state was 34,110 square kilometres (approximately the size of present-day Netherlands).  After the Third Anglo-Maratha War, and the treaty with the British in 1818 to its accession to the Republic of India in 1949, the boundaries of Udaipur state were as follows: the state was bounded on the north by the British district of Ajmer-Merwara; on the west by Jodhpur and Sirohi; on the southwest by Idar; on the south by Dungarpur, Banswara and Pratabgarh; on the east by Bundi and Kota; and on the northeast by Jaipur.

Origin

Less is known about the origins of the Kingdom of Mewar. It was originally ruled by the Guhila dynasty. Guhadatta is considered the first ruler of the kingdom in the 7th century. In the early 8th century, it came under the sub ordinance of the regional Mori rulers. The kingdom under Bappa Rawal acquired control of Chittor in 728 after taking it away from its Mori overlords. Nagda was the capital of Mewar around this period.
Bappa Rawal defeated an early Arab Caliphate invasion of India through a confederation with Gurjar-Pratihara ruler Nagabhata I. Bappa Rawals successors, namely Khuman II would continue to resist Arab incursions into the country.

The Guhilas from the 8th century acknowledged the suzerainty of the Gurjara-Pratiharas. In the 10th century, Bharttripatta II became an independent ruler and broke ties with the Pratihara empire and assumed the title Maharajadhiraja. His successor Allata killed Devapala, the ruler of the Gurjara Pratihara at that time.

The Guhilas was controlled by the Parmaras in the 11th century and by the Chahamanas in the 12th century. Guhila ruler Samant Singh established another branch of Guhilas in Vagad and also fought alongside the defeated Prithviraja III of Ajmer in Second Battle of Tarain against Muizzuddin Muhammad Ghuri.

Through the 13th century, the Guhilas started getting more powerful and became independent of the Chahamana rule. It had to resist multiple invasions by Turkic invaders. Eventually, in 1303 Sultan of Delhi, Alauddin Khalji invaded Mewar, besieged Chittor. In the siege, Rana Lakhan with his seven sons died in the battle and the women committed Jauhar. Although, Ajay Singh survived the disaster who later brought up Hammir.

Reestablishment as Sisodia Kingdom

Rana Hammir 

Following the invasion by Alauddin Khalji in 1303, the entire family branch was killed. In 1326, Hammir Singh, who descendant of Rahapa, son of Ranasimha, regained control of the region after marrying the daughter of Cahaman chief Maldev who assigned him some territories, although a firm hold was established after he replused an army of Delhi Sultanate at the Battle of Singoli and started using the title 'Rana'. Thus he founded the Sisodia clan.

Hammirs son Kshetra Singh defeated the governor of Malwa Dilawar Khan and his grandson Lakha Singh was defeated by Zafar Khan of Gujarat. Lakha's son Mokal Singh became the Rana at a very young age, so his mother Hansa Bai acted as a regent for him. Mokal's brother Chunda left the fort because of conflicts between him and Hansa bai. During Mokal's rule, the kingdom was invaded by Sultan of Nagaur but the Sultan was driven away. It was also invaded twice by Ahmad Shah of Gujarat, who was driven out once but during the second invasion, Mokal was assassinated by his uncles Chacha and Mera.

Rana Kumbha 

After his father's assassination, Rana Kumbha ascended to the throne in 1433. He first dealt with this fathers assassins and killed them. He invaded the sultanate of Nagaur and captured Supadlaksha striking a rivalry with the Sultan of Nagaur and Gujarat. In 1442, Sultan of Malwa attacked Mewar but was defeated but he captured the fort of Gagron in a brutal battle. Several attempts were made to capture Mandalgarh but failed. Throughout the next few years, the Sultan of Gujarat and Malwa made several attempts to capture Mewar but failed repeatedly. In 1456, the fort of Mandalgarh was taken in a brutal fight and Ajmer was also captured by the sultan of Malwa. Particularly, many efforts were made to capture the fort of Kumbhalgarh fort but failed every time. Kumbha is known to have constructed many invincible forts that still stand today. He was also a scholar and constructed many temples. In 1468 he was assassinated by his son, Udai Singh I.

After Kumbha's assassination, Udai took over the throne, but he was defeated by his brother Rana Raimal in 1473. Under Raimal , the kingdom was attacked Ghiyath Shah of Malwa , he walked through Ahar, Eklingji and besieged Chittor. In this battle, he was defeated badly and had to retreat. Another army of Malwa was defeated by Raimal at Mandalgarh. The sultan of Malwa captured Bundi and expelled its chief Rao Surtan who came to Mewar and sought refuge. Raimal lost areas of Amber, Naraina and Sikar. Towards the end of Raimal's reign, his sons Prithviraj, Sangram and Jaimal started fighting for the throne. At the end of the conflict, Sangram ended up being the only claimant to the throne.

Rana Sanga 

After his father's death, Sangram Singh ascended on the throne in 1509. Around 1517, in the Sultanate of Malwa under the Sultan Mahmud Khilji II, too much power landed in the hands of Medini Rai which upset a lot of Muslim nobles. Eventually, Mahmud himself asked for help from the Sultan of Gujarat to get rid of Medini Rai. The war started as the two sultans besieged Mandu where Rai's son died. Sanga supported Medini Rai and in turn attacked and captured Gagron where he appointed Medini Rai to govern as a replacement to his prior holdings in Malwa.

In 1518, Ibrahim Lodhi ascended to the throne of Delhi. He engaged with Sanga in two major battles when he realized Sanga had been encroaching on land in the Sultanate. The sultan was defeated at Khatoli and Dholpur; as a result, Sanga was able to capture the entire North-East Rajputana up to Chanderi. This defeat was a humiliating setback for the new sultan as he lost much territory to an internal conflict in his empire. In the Battle of Khatoli, a sword injured Sanga's arm, and his leg was injured by an arrow, making him lame.

In 1518 Mahmud Khilji II collected another massive army and invaded Mewar through Gagron. In the ensuing battle, the Maharana won decisively; he took Khilji captive, appointed a physician to care for Khilji, and later escorted him back to his kingdom to Mandu. In 1520, Sangram decided to attack Idar and the Sultanate of Gujarat after a furious exchange with him. In the ensuing campaign, the Rana not only completely captured Idar, but also raided Ahmadabad and returned with massive wealth looted.

After looting Ahmadnagar, the Sultan of Malwa and Gujarat mobilized heavily in 1521 against the Rana, who joined forces with the entire Rajputana. In the end, the heavy mobilization was of no use, and Sanga could use his brilliant diplomatic skills to scare the Sultana. The same year, Ibrahim Lodhi tried to attack the Rana but failed again. It is around this time that Sanga's power is at its zenith. He had thoroughly defeated Gujarat and Delhi, largely captured Malwa, and allied with the remaining parts of Rajputana.

In 1526, Babur invaded, defeated and killed Ibrahim Lodhi. Thus, the foundation of the Mughal Empire is from the Lodhi Empire's remains. After successful skirmishes, Sanga suffered a serious reverse despite the numerical superiority because of the use of Gun powder by the Mughals. He was wounded in battle and was removed in an unconscious state by Prithviraj Kachwaha of Amber. His generals eventually poisoned him for not leaving a desire to defeat Babur after being defeated in Khanwa.

After Sangram's death, his son Ratan Singh II was placed on the throne by the generals. Mahmud Khilji, whom Sangram badly defeated, tried to cash the opportunity of a week Rana and invaded but was badly defeated and was also defeated in a counterattack. In 1531, he was killed in battle. His brother Rana Vikramaditya succeeded him at a young age, and was unpopular. During his reign, Mewar was invaded by Bahadur Shah of Gujarat. His cousin Vanvir Singh Kelwa assassinated Mewar, usurped the throne in 1534, and kept it for six years. Vanvir also attempted to kill Vikramaditya's brother Udai. However, Udai's nurse Panna Dhai placed her son in Udai's bed, getting him killed and saving the heir to the throne.

In 1540, an older Udai took over Chittor and let Vanvir walk away. He became Udai Singh II.

Battles against the Mughals

Udai Singh II 

Early into his reign, Maldev Rathore unsuccessfully invaded Mewar. In 1557, he was defeated by a joint invasion by Haji Khan and Maldeo Rathore in the Battle of Haramada. He is most known for establishing the city of Udaipur. The city was designed with the use of gun powder by Persian invaders in India. He settled people in the city and constructed forts as well.

During his reign, Akbar, Babur's grandson, made great efforts to get the Maharana to accept his suzerainty by sending emissaries and envoys. When Udai Singh rejected all offers, Akbar considered invading Mewar. Udai Singh had faith in his forts as they had defended the rulers for decades in the past and were very strong. He was advised by his generals to make adequate arrangements for defence and then retire to the hilly areas of Chittor, which he heeded.

Siege of Chittor (1567) 
Akbar laid siege to the fort of Chittor and started making direct attacks. When these attacks failed to do any damage, he ordered construction of Sabats (approach trenches). The Rajput defenses showered the constructors of these Sabats with arrows and cannonballs but eventually the sabats' construction was complete. Explosives were set on these sabats for breaching the sturdy Chittor walls and explosions were able to break some walls but the Rajputs quickly filled those cavities. The explosions killed hundreds of Mughal soldiers and threw rocks miles away and was heard in towns very distant. Several other Sabats were built in front of other walls. These explosions disheartened many Mughal soldiers and Akbar himself but the siege kept going. While fighting, Jaimal Rathore, the commander of Mewari forces was shot dead by Akbar, soon after which the doors of Chittor were breached and Rajput soldiers fought to death. Women of the fort committed Jauhar. Soon the fort was taken over and Akbar commanded a slaughter of around 30,000 inhabitants of the fort. Udai Singh II died 4 years later in 1572.

Maharana Pratap Singh 
Udai wanted his second son Jagmal to succeed him, but after his death, his eldest son, Pratap was enthroned by the generals. The order of damage inflicted by Mughal forces in 1568 to Chittor meant that Pratap was not willing to make any concessions to Akbar. He saw Mughals as invaders who were resisted by his father and grandfather. Within 1 year, diplomatic missions by top Mughal officials like Man Singh, Bhagwant Das, Todar Mal failed to convince Pratap to accept Mughal dominance, appear in Mughal court, pay tribute and enlist as a Mansabdar.

Battle of Haldighati
Pratap soon started to prepare for a big battle. He retired from his fortress until Chittor was recaptured, forbade the use of silver and gold in the kingdom, and forbade sowing of crops to prevent Mughal forces from acquiring supplies from his own land. The big battle came in the form of the Battle of Haldighati with Akbar sending Man Singh against the forces of Mewar headed by Pratap.

Pratap first attacked on the center wing of the army which forced Mughals to retreat. Mewar army was also able to break the left and right wing of the Mughal Army. It was appearing that Mewar would win but slowly Mewari army started getting exhausted and Mihtar Khan on the Mughal side started beating the kettle-drums and spread a rumour about the arrival of the Emperor's army reinforcements, which raised the morale of the Mughal army and turned the battle in their favour. The Mewari soldiers starting deserting in large numbers, finding the day lost and eventually Pratap was injured and had to leave the battlefield. A Jhala chieftain called Man Singh took the Rana's place and donned some of his royal emblems by which the Mughals mistook him for the Rana. Man Singh Jhala was eventually killed, however his act of bravery gave the Rana enough time to safely retreat.

Next year in 1577, Akbar's forces under Shahbaz Khan attacked the fort of Kumbhalgarh, one of the most important forts for the Rajputs. During the fierce siege, Pratap had to leave the fort to his generals who defended it till April 1578 and lost to the Mughals after a heavy fight. After the fall of Kumbhalgarh, Pratap was chased by Shahbaz khan for several years, trying to capture him but he escaped multiple times. It was later through his general Bhamashah's help, that he was able to replenish his army.

Battle of Dewair
After a few years preparations, Prataps son prince Amar was able to defeat Mughal Commander Sultan Ghori at the Battle of Dewair in 1582 and Kumbhalgarh was taken by Pratap from Abdullah Khan in 1583. Over the next few years, Akbars pursuit for Pratap loosened and he started focusing on his own empire. Pratap was able to capture all important forts in Mewar accept Chittorgarh and Mandalgarh which remained under his reign for the rest of his life. He died in 1597.

Amar Singh 
Pratap's 38 year old son Amar succeeded him. In 1600, his kingdom was invaded by Akbar's son Salim in which Mughals were defeated and their top generals like Sultan Khan Ghori were killed. Akbar tried to make another attempt to invade Mewar in 1605 but the invasion was cut short by his death. After Akbar, his son Salim succeeded as Jahangir and sent a large force under his son Parviz to invade Mewar. To defend against Parviz, Amar built a new capital at Chawand, a hilly location in Mewar. Then preparations were made to defend against the Mughals. In 1606, in the Battle of Diwair, Mughals were badly defeated. During this time, Amar' son Sagar defected from Rajputs to Mughals and was appointed at Chittor by Jahangir. In 1608, a massive army under Mahabat Khan was sent to Mewar through Mandal and Chittor. This army was badly defeated and had to retreat because of continuous raids by Rajput forces. In 1609, Mahabat Khan was replaced with Abdullah Khan who was able to defeat Mewar in several battles from 1609 to 1611. In an attack by Abdullah Khan, Amar Singh was forced to abandon the capital of Chawand.

The Mughals continued to chase the Maharana for several years but no one was able to capture the Rana. After this, in 1613, Jahangir himself came to Rajputana to supervise the campaign. His son Khurram led the campaign on the ground. Rajputs were easily able to seek refuge in the hilly tracks of Rajputana and the Mughals largely failed to penetrate it. They were finally able to penetrate it in 1614 when they engaged with Mewar forces and established outposts. Many attempts were made by Jahangir to make settlements with the Maharana and the final attempt in 1615 succeeded when Amar Singh agreed to meet with Prince Khurram.

Treaty with Mughals 
In February 1615, Khurram and Amar Singh met in Gogundah. Tributes were exchanged between the Maharana and the Prince. Following terms were accepted by both the parties.
Maharana's eldest son would serve under the Emperor.
Maharana would provide a 1000 horsemen contingent in the Mughal Army.
Maharana would never try to return to Chittorgarh. Ranks were provided to Maharana's heir Karan. Other official honors and ranks were also exchanged. Jahangir got marble statues of Amar and Karan Singh constructed in Deccan and installed in a garden in Agra.

Throughout the rest of his life, Amar spent time in Udaipur, making administrative reforms to his kingdom and restoring it. He died in 1620 at the age of 60.

As a Mughal state 
 Karan succeeded his father Amar in 1620. He reformed his kingdom and repaired several temples including the Ranakpur Jain temple damaged by Mughal commanders. Karan also helped prince Khurram and gave him refuge when he had rebelled against his father in 1623. Karan also supported Mahabat Khan, who rebelled against Jahangir. Khurram stayed for 4 months and exchanged turbans with the Maharana which is still stored in Pratap Museum. When Jahangir died in 1627, Khurram passed through Mewar and met with Karan again. Khurram was crowned the Mughal emperor as Shah Jahan. Karan died 2 months later.

After Karan's death, his son Jagat succeeded him in 1628. He was sent a robe of honor by Shah Jahan. Jagat invaded Dungarpur because it enlisted itself in the Mughal Mansabdari system. In the resulting war, Dungarpur lost and its ruler was killed. He get the famous Jag Mandir constructed during his reign.

Spoiled relations with Mughals

Jagat Singh died after a 24 year long reign and was succeeded by his son Raj. Towards the end of Jagat's reign, Mughal-Mewar relations had been strained. Shah Jahan sent a robe of honor for Raj Singh as well but the relations could not be restored. Raj continued making restorations to the Chittor fort, going against the Mughal-Mewar treaty of 1615. Maharana had constructed walls around the fort and had reduced the contingent size given to the Mughals. Maharana then sent a diplomatic mission to the Mughals to settle the issue. But eventually Shah Jahan ordered his son son Aurangzeb and grandson Mahmud to invade Chittor and demolish the new wall in 1654. Eventually Shah Jahan withdrew Mughal forces and letters of settlement and assurances were exchanged.

War of succession

In 1658, the Mughal war of succession was going on and Raj Singh took an advantage and invaded the Mughals and successfully loot and plunder in adjacent areas. Throughout the war, Raj Singh remained neutral among the fighting brothers but he disliked Dara Shikoh and liked Aurangzeb. He maintained contact and good relations with Prince Aurangzeb and sent his emissaries when Aurangzeb won the war of succession. After the war of succession, Raj Singh was able to win the favor of Aurangzeb and was awarded territories of Mandal and Bansawara and he was granted ranks.

In 1658, Raj Singh embarked on his own expeditions using pretence of a ceremonial "Tikadaur", traditionally taken in enemy land. The Maharana swooped down on various Mughal posts in 1658. Levies were imposed on outposts and tracts like Mandal, Banera, Shahpura, Sawar, Jahazpur, Phulia etc. which were then under Mughal control, and some areas were annexed. He next attacked pargana of Malpura, Tonk, Chatsu, Lalsot and Sambhar. He expanded the Mewar kingdom to bigger heights than before.

Mughal Mewar relations worsened further when in 1660, Raj Singh eloped with Charumati, who was going to be married to Aurangzeb. This was seen as a hostile act and several territories were confiscated from Mewar. Attempts were made to stop this confiscation but all attempts failed.

Oppressions of Hindus
When in the 1660s, Aurangzeb ordered demolitions of several important Hindu temples, Raj Singh made several efforts to secure safety of Hindu Symbols. Famous symbols rescued include the Shrinathji installed in Nathawada in Udaipur in 1662. In 1679, when Jaziya was imposed on non-Hindus in the Mughal empire, Raj Singh possibly protested against Aurangzeb by writing him a letter. Such events further spoiled relations with the Mughal emperor. During this period, Maharana continued to raid and loot adjacent territories.

Rajput-Mughal war 1679 - 1707
During the 1670s, Aurangzeb was engaging with his rivals, the Rathores. In 1679, Raj granted 12 villages to Ajit Singh Rathore. Aurangzeb begged Raj to remain loyal to him and not support Ajit, but this was not heeded by Raj Singh.

Aurangzeb sent multiple of his generals to fight with the Rana but Raj Singh defeated all of them and then Aurangzeb himself came down to the battleground. On the suggestion of his war council, Raj depopulated Udaipur and abandoned the city. In January 1680, Mughals reached Udaipur and damaged the city heavily. A major force of Mughals under Hasan Ali Khan was defeated at Nainwara. Finding it difficult to defeat Rajputs in hilly tracks, Aurangzeb left Udaipur in 1680. Raj Singh carried out sudden raids on Mughal and Malwa forces keeping them terrified. Such raids often created heavy disruption in Mughal forces.

At the height of the Rajput-Mughal war in 1680, Raj Singh died, possibly due to poisoning by Aurangzeb loyalists or by illness and fever. He was succeeded by his son Jai Singh. Under Jai, sudden attacks on Mughals continued. Mughal forces under Dilair Khan were defeated by Mewar in the same year.

Raj had made attempts to sponsor a rebellion in the Mughal empire by tempting Aurangzeb's son Akbar. His attempt was cut short by his death, but was successfully carried out by Jai in 1681. Aurangzeb overcame this by writing a false letter to his son telling him to continue deceitful collaboration with Rajputs in order to destroy them. This was intercepted by Rajputs who were tricked into believing that Akbar's alliance with them was a hoax and distanced themselves with him. Soon, in the same year, Aurangzeb was able to strike a settlement with Jai through his son Muhammad Azam to prevent the Akbar's rebellion to grow big. In 1681, Jai Singh agreed to pay Jaziya, send a contingent to the deccan under the Mughals and they were granted several territories in adjacent regions in a meeting with Muhammad Azam. Following the settlement, ranks and honors were exchanged. Jai Singh wasn't handed the possession of the granted territories and over the next one decade, he would penalize the emperor by stopping the payment of Jaziya and the Aurangzeb would penalize him for defaulting on Jaziya in other instances by taking away other territories. 

Jai died in 1698 and his son Amar Singh II succeeded him in 1699. In 1699, right after Amar Singh II ascended to the throne, he invaded Durganpur, Bansawara and Devaliya. Rulers of these regions appealed to Mughal court for justice but in most cases, Maharana prevailed.

In 1707, Aurangzeb died and his sons started the war of succession. During this war, Amar supported Prince Muazzam who later won the war and was crowned Bahadur Shah I. Taking advantage of the war, Amar also captured the granted cities that were under Mughal control like Pur, Mandal and Shahpura.

Triple alliance against the Mughals

After the war of succession, Bahadur Shah I tried to get hold of the states of Amber and Marwar. These states had captured significant territories after Aurangzeb's death in 1707. Bahadur Shah was able to take the Marwar state without any resistance but had to take Jodhpur and the Amber state with force. He then chased Amar Singh II into Mewar territory. Amar Singh made a matrimonial alliance with Sawai Jai Singh of Amber by marrying his daughter Chandrakumari with him.  Amar Singh, Ajit Singh and Jai Singh made a triple alliance to take back Amber and Marwar. The combined Rajput forces of the alliance attempted to capture Amber in 1708 but failed. They also attempted to capture Jodhpur and succeeded.

Battle of Sambhar
Soon, the battle of Sambhar was fought in which major Mughal commanders were killed and Rajputs won. Pur and Mandal were recaptured by Mewar. As a result of this battle, states of Amber and Marwar were restored but the rulers were posted in Gujarat and Kabul which they denied to follow.

Soon after the settlement, in 1709, Ajit Singh, Jai Singh and Amar Singh started to prepare for a large war with the Mughals with 70,000 cavalry to quell their deployments in Gujarat and Kabul. Bahadur Shah tried to persuade them to not start a war and at the height of negotiations, Amar Singh II died. He was succeeded by his son Sangram Singh II.

Battle with Ranabaaz Khan
Right after coronation of Sangram II, Bahadur Shah granted the territories of Mandal and Pur to one Ranabaaz Khan Mewati. Sangram did not give the possession of these territories to Mewati which lead to the Battle of Bandanwara in 1711. In the resulting battle, Mewati was killed and Sangram retained Mandal and Pur. Any retaliatory action by Bahadur Shah I were cut short by his death in 1712.

Soon, a war of succession broke between the sons of Bahadur Shah and eventually the only surviving son, Jahandar Shah became Emperor but only for 8 months, and was defeated and killed by his cousin Farrukhsiyar with the help of the Sayyid Brothers.

Decline of Mughal Empire
Soon, Sangram made good relations with Farrukhsiyar and honors were exchanged per the traditions. With the help of Sawai Jai Singh, Sangram was able to obtain the territories of Idar, Durganpur, Devaliya from the Emperor in 1716. Sangram extracted heavy tributes from these rulers. He was also allowed to mint his own coins in 1713.

Maratha influence

Resistance 
Starting from 1711, during Sangram's reign, the Marathas started raiding into the Rajputana in the states of Dungarpur, Banswara, and Bundi. They were driven off in their first attempts. Several attempts to form united fronts against such raids throughout 1710s and 1720s failed.. Sangram II passed away in 1734 and was succeeded by his son Jagat Singh II. To counter the Marathas, Maharana Jagat Singh of Mewar convened a conference of Rajput rulers in Hurda in 1734, but no agreement materialised. In 1735, Mughals tried to defend against the Maratha penetration by sending a force under Qamar uddin but failed and Marathas reached Jaipur.

Subordinance 
Peshwa Baji Rao I attempted to persuade Jagat to settle terms of Chauth, a tributary tax but such attempts failed. However, Jagat continued to pay a sum of money equivalent to the revenue of one territory to Holkars, the province of Marathas. In February 1736, the Peshwa arranged a friendly visit to Maharana Jagat and met him at Udaipur. During this meeting, he was able to secure chauth from the Maharana. Hence friendly relations were established between Marathas and Mewar. With the help of the Holkars, Jagat was able to secure the throne of Jaipur for his relative Madho Singh. In 1750, Ishwari Singh, the other contender for the throne committed suicide under the financial pressure by the Marathas and Madho Singh was able to capture the throne completely. Madho was able to stay afloat because of heavy investment by Jagat Singh.

Financial devastation 
Jagat Singh died in 1751 and his imprisoned son Pratap but he could rule only for 3 years and died in 1754 and was succeeded by his young son Raj. During his rule, Maratha's continuous and increasing demand for tribute financially destroyed Mewar. Raj could only rule for 7 years and died without an heir. Such financial devastation continued under his uncle Ari's rule, under whom, Mewar was raided by the Marathas many times from 1761 to 1773.

After Ari's death in 1773, his underaged son Hamir became the Maharana and under him, a lot of power rested in the hands of his mother Sadar Kanwar and her trusted assistant Ram Pyari. Hammir died in 1778 and was succeeded by his brother Bhim. During Bhim's reign, Mewar was raided multiple times by the Pindaris, an unregulated military.

War over Bhim Singh's daughter 
Bhim Singh's daughter Krishna Kumari was initially engaged to Maharaja Bhim Singh of Marwar but then Maharana Bhim's wife, a Jaipur princess, suggested Krishna to be married to Jaipur ruler Sawai Jagat Singh.

Mewar in the British Raj 
By 1818, the armies of Holkar, Scindia, and Tonk had plundered Mewar, pauperising Bhim Singh.As early as 1805, Maharana Bhim Singh of Mewar approached the East India Company (EIC) for assistance but the Treaty of 1803 with Scindia prevented the British from entertaining the request. But by 1817, the British too were anxious to have alliances with Rajput rulers and the Treaty of Friendship, Alliances and Unity was concluded between Mewar and EIC on 13 January 1818.

After the Third Anglo-Maratha War and under the treaty, the British Government agreed to protect the territory of Mewar, in return for which Mewar acknowledged British supremacy and agreed to abstain from political associations with other states and to pay one-fourth of its revenues as tribute for 5 years, and three-eight in perpetuity. 

Col. James Tod was appointed as the Political agent of Udaipur to the EIC and he worked to reestablish the Maharana as the central figure in the region. His kaulnama of 1818 established the Maharana as the "absolute supremacy" among his chiefs. Col Tod remained the Political Agent from 1818 to 1822 and resigned citing ill health.

Under the EIC, within 3 years, revenue of Mewar increase by more than double. Still, this revenue couldn't save Mewar. By Bhim Singh's death in 1828, and his son Jawan Singh's accession in the same year, Mewar had gone bankrupt. Mewar had also racked a lot of debt from the EIC. Jawan Singh was mostly interested in consumption of alcohol and less in administration. He died in 1838 leaving no heir and his throne, after a long discussion among senior nobles, was offered to Sardar Singh, the great-grandson of Maharana Sangram Singh II from his son Nath Singh of Bagore.

Sardar Singh heavily cracked down on the supporters of his contender, Sardul Singh, and imprisoned many of those supporters. He died soon in 1842 and was succeeded by his brother Swarup Singh. He made several Administrative reforms which also led to improvement in the financial situation. He also abolished sati in Mewar. He extended help to the EIC during the 1857 revolt by giving shelter to distressed European families and by cracking down on the supporters of the revolt in Mewar. 

Swarup died in 1861 and was succeeded by his nephew Shambhu Singh who was a minor at the time. British applied their regency policy on him and appointed regency council. This council brought some reforms like abolishing begaar and selling of children and women. The Legal system was tweaked to be more like the western system and new roads were built. in 1865, when British handed over control back to Shambhu Singh, the financial position of Mewar was much better. He further reformed the region till the end of his reign in 1874. A new legal code was introduced in Mewar in 1870.

A constitution for Udaipur State was adopted on May 23, 1947.

List of Maharanas

Administrative structure 
At the time of the 1901 census, the state was divided into 17 administrative sub-divisions - 11 zilas and 6 parganas, the difference between a zila and pargana being that the latter was larger and broken up into further subdivisions. Further, there were 28 principal jagirs and 2 bhumats. Each zila was administered by a hakim, a state official, supported at each tehsil (a zila sub-division) by an assistant hakim. The state was poorly managed before British rule. The revenue of Udaipur state was Rs.4,00,000 with a debt of Rs.29,00,000 in 1819, after which the British took over the administration. The state revenue showed improvement under British agents, the revenue rising to Rs.8,00,000 in 1821 and an average of Rs.28,00,000 in 1899–1900.

Land tenure 
The principal forms of land tenure in the state were jagir, bhum, sasan, and khalsa. Jagirs were grants of land made in recognition service of a civil or political nature. Jagirdars, the holders of jagir, usually paid a fixed annual tribute called chhatund on an annual basis, and nazarana on the succession of a new Maharana. On the death of a jagirdar, the jagir reverted to the Maharana until the late jagirdar's successor was recognized by the Maharana. Those holding bhum tenures paid a small tribute or nominal quit-rent (bhum barar), and were liable to be called on for local service. Sasan (also known as muafi) holders were not liable for payments to the Maharana but taxes were sometimes recovered from them. Khalsa (crown lands) holders were cultivators who were undisturbed in their possession as long as they continued to pay land revenue. As of 1912, 38% of the land revenue of the State was from khalsa land, the rest from other forms of tenure.

See also 
Jodhpur State
Mewar Residency
Rajputana

References

Bibliography

Further reading 

 The Kingdom of Mewar: great struggles and glory of the world's oldest ruling dynasty, by Irmgard Meininger. D.K. Printworld, 2000. .
 Costumes of the rulers of Mewar: with patterns and construction techniques, by Pushpa Rani Mathur. Abhinav Publications, 1994. .

Princely states of Rajasthan
Rajputs
States and territories established in 1818
States and territories disestablished in 1949
8th-century establishments in India
19th-century establishments in India
1818 establishments in Asia
1949 disestablishments in India
Historical Hindu kingdoms
Rajput princely states